Events from the year 1735 in Ireland.

Incumbent
Monarch: George II

Events
c. December – Bishop George Berkeley's economic text The Querist begins publication anonymously in Dublin.
Construction of the Magazine Fort in Phoenix Park, Dublin, begins.
Thomas Carte's An History of the Life of James, Duke of Ormonde begins publication in London.

Arts and literature
The first known printed poetry by an Ulster Scots writer (in the Habbie stanza form) is published in a broadsheet in Strabane.

Births

February 27 – Thomas Conway, soldier of fortune (d. c.1800)
July 19 – Garret Wesley, 1st Earl of Mornington, politician and composer (d. 1781)
September 22 – Charles Bingham, 1st Earl of Lucan, politician (d. 1799)
William Blakeney, British Army officer and politician (d. 1804)
Thomas Busby, soldier and innkeeper (d. 1798)
Sir Thomas Butler, 6th Baronet, politician (d. 1772)
Patrick Duigenan, lawyer and politician (d. 1816)
John McCausland, politician (d. 1804)
Edward Dominic O'Brien, British Army officer (d. 1801)

Deaths
January 25 – Matthew Clerk, Presbyterian minister (b. 1659)
February 26 – Gustavus Hamilton, politician (b. c.1685)
March 4 - Mary Mercer (of Mercer's Hospital, Stephen Street, Dublin)
August 4 – George St George, 1st Baron St George, politician (b. c.1658)
August 27 – Peter Browne, Church of Ireland Bishop of Cork and Ross and writer (b. c.1665)

References

 
Years of the 18th century in Ireland
Ireland
1730s in Ireland